Football at the 2019 South Asian Games is the 3rd edition to introduce Women's football to the games, alongside men's.

Competition schedule
The men's tournament will be held from 1 December to 10 December 2019 while the women's tournament will be contested from 3 December to 10 December 2019.

Venues
Football at the 2019 South Asian Games is scheduled to be held in two venues in Nepal; the Dasarath Rangasala Stadium in Kathmandu for the men's tournament and the Pokhara Rangasala in Pokhara for the women's tournament.

Participating nations

Men's tournament

  Bangladesh
  Bhutan
  India‡
  Maldives
  Nepal
  Sri Lanka

 ‡ India decided not to participate in the men's event but was included in the men's event draw.

Women's tournament

  India
  Maldives
  Nepal
  Sri Lanka

Medal summary

Medal table

Medalists

References

2019 South Asian Games
Events at the 2019 South Asian Games
2019 South Asian Games